Myth Takes is the third album by !!!. The album was released on March 5, 2007. It was recorded in Nashville, Tennessee, United States, and features drummer Jerry Fuchs. Early limited edition copies of the CD version of the album came with a second disc containing three remixes.

The first single was "Heart of Hearts", which was released as a free download and a limited vinyl picture disc on February 19, 2007. A video has been made for "Must Be the Moon" by Ben Dickinson. "Must Be the Moon" was released as a single on May 14, 2007 (June 5, 2007 in North America). It is only available as a digital download and 12" vinyl.

The song "All My Heroes Are Weirdos" is available in the video games Tony Hawk's Proving Ground and FIFA 08. "Yadnus" would be heard in an episode of The Blacklist. In addition, the Still Going to the Roadhouse mix of "Yadnus" appears on the Radio Broker radio station in Grand Theft Auto IV. The album art was created by artist Kevin Hooyman, a friend of the band. The song "Must Be the Moon" was featured in a 2010 Cartoon Network bumper.

A poster advertising this album is prominently featured on the wall of the basement office that forms the setting of the British sitcom The IT Crowd.

Track listing

Personnel
Band members
Mario Andreoni – guitars, bass guitar, some keyboard, some percussion
Nic Offer – vocals, keyboards, some guitars
Tyler Pope – guitars, bass guitar, synths, drum programming
John Pugh – vocals, drums, some bass, some percussion
Justin van der Volgen – bass
Allan Wilson – horns, synth, percussion
Gerhardt Fuchs – drums

Additional musicians
Jonno Lee, David Weiss, Joseph Baldbridge, Dayvan Duronslet, John Blake – drum corps on "All My Heroes Are Weirdos"
Shannon Funchess – vocals on "Heart of Hearts"
Jared Samuel clavinet on "Heart of Hearts"
Eric Emm – E bow on "Infinifold"
Olivia Mori – vocals on "Infinifold"
Phyllis Forbes, Molly Schnick, Madeline Davies – vocals on "Break in Case of Anything"
Amy Cimini – viola on "Infinifold"
Heather Sommerlad, Lori Told, Alex Powell, Adele Mori – strings on "Yadnus"

Charts

References

External links
Official site at Warp Records

!!! at MySpace

2007 albums
!!! albums
Warp (record label) albums